The role of women in the Philippines is explained based on the context of Filipino culture, standards, and mindsets. The Philippines is described to be a nation of strong women, who directly and indirectly run the family unit, businesses, government agencies and haciendas.

Although they generally define themselves in the milieu of a male-dominated post-colonial society, Filipino women live in a culture that is focused on the community, with the family as the main unit of society, but not always according to this stereotype.  It is in this framework of Philippine hierarchical structure, class differences, religious justifications, and living in a globally developing nation wherein Filipino women struggle for respect. Compared to other parts of Southeast Asia, women in Philippine society have always enjoyed a greater share of equality.

History

Archaic epoch

Some pre-colonial social structures of the Philippines gave equal importance to maternal and paternal lineage. This bilateral kinship system accorded Philippine women enormous power within a clan.  They were entitled to property, engage in a trade and could exercise their right to divorce her husband.  They could also become village chiefs in the absence of a male heir.  Before the arrival of the Spaniards, Filipino women could also achieve status as medicine women or high-priestesses and astrologers.

History
In the precolonial era of the Phlippines there are numerous women are entitled as a Hara and  Dayang, the female presence in the Noble caste are prominent in the kinship system in the Philippine societies, here are the examples of notable Queens in the Philippine history: 
Dayang Buka (C.900 CE) Known in LCI. She was married to Senapati Jayadewa who was the Rajah of Tondo as a bargain to clear the debt of 1 kati and 8 suwarnas of her parents Namwaran and Dayang Angkatan.
 Hara Udaya or Queen Urduja is a legendary warrior princess who is recognized as a heroine in Pangasinan. The name Urduja appears to be Sanskrit in origin, and a variation of the name "Udaya", meaning "arise" or "rising sun", or the name "Urja", meaning "breath". A historical reference to Urduja can be found in the travel account of Ibn Battuta (1304 – possibly 1368 or 1377 AD), a Muslim traveler from Morocco. Ibn Battuta sailed for 17 days to reach China from the land of Tawalisi.
 Dayang Sima (c. 637 CE)  is The legendary queen of South Cotabato known for her sense of justice and respect for the law.
 Empress Sasaban  (c.1300s) in oral tradition recounted by Nick Joaquin and Leonardo Vivencio, a "lady of Namayan" who went to the Madjapahit court to marry Emperor Soledan, eventually giving birth to Balagtas, who then returned to Namayan/Pasig in 1300.
Dayang Kalangitan (r. 1450–ca. 1515) is the only recorded Dayang or queen regnant of the pre-Hispanic Philippine kingdoms of Tondo and Namayan. The eldest daughter of Rajah Gambang and co-regent with her husband, Rajah Lontok, she is considered one of the most powerful rulers in the kingdom's history. She is also notably a  Buddhist ruler of the kingdom, which encompassed land along the banks of the Pasig River in Metro Manila.
 Tuanbaloka is woman from Basilan who ascended to power and become the Queen consort of Jolo known for her bravery as she and her husband held of the invaders with 4,000 warriors.

Babaylan 
The babaylan held positions of authority as religious leaders, community doctors and healers in some pre-colonial Philippine societies. The vital functions of the babaylan were highly recognized and embodied in the traditional role of women in a barangay.  Cross-dressing males sometimes took on the role of the female babaylan.

The babaylan, also called katalonan, bayoguin, bayok, agi-ngin, asog, bido and binabae depending on the ethnic group of the region, held important positions in the community. They were the spiritual leaders of the Filipino communities, tasked with responsibilities pertaining to rituals, agriculture, science, medicine, literature and other forms of knowledge that the community needed.

In a barangay, the babaylan worked alongside the datu on important social activities. In the absence of a datu, the babaylan could take charge of the whole community.

The role of the babaylan was mostly associated to females, but male babaylans also existed. Early historical accounts record the existence of male babaylans who wore female clothes and took the demeanor of a woman. Anatomy was not the only basis for gender. Gender was based primarily on occupation, appearance, actions and sexuality.

Spanish Philippines 

Although Christian values were supposed to be spread through the population, missionaries and priests soon realized that they'd be better off adapting their doctrine as much as possible to the local customs, rather than trying to impose it.  Although the concept of gender equality existed in the Philippines during the pre-Hispanic era this  changed when the Spaniards came and patterned the image of the Filipina to a meek and submissive individual.  As it happened all over Asia, women in the Philippines were expected to become caring and nurturing mothers for their own children and take care of most household chores. Also a trait found all over Asia was the preference of most families to have male children instead of females.

During the last part of the colonization of the Philippines, Isabella II of Spain,  introduced the Education Decree of 1863 (10 years before Japan had a compulsory free modern public education and 40 years before the United States government started a free modern public school system in the Philippines) that provided for the establishment and for the building of at least two free primary schools, one for the boys and another school for the girls, in each town under the responsibility of the municipal government.

American Philippines
When Spain lost the Spanish–American War in 1898, the Philippines was ceded to the United States of America.  The U.S.A. introduced a new public education system which retained opportunity to every child regardless of gender.

Through the American-patterned school system, Filipino women became professionals, although most of them and their male counterparts opted for making use of their former education roots and expressed themselves in Spanish or Tagalog. According to the Monroe Commission on Philippine Education: “Upon leaving school, more than 99% of Filipinos will not speak English in their homes. Possibly, only 10% to 15% of the next generation will be able to use this language in their occupations. In fact, it will only be the government employees, and the professionals, who might make use of English.”

Contemporary roles
Modern-day Philippine women play a decisive role in Filipino families. They usually handle the money, act as religious mentors, and can also make all the important family decisions.

Urban setting
In the past, firms and businesses generally hire Filipino women for less pay and secretarial functions. But at present, Filipino women are given the same opportunities as their male counterparts in the business realm. This is due to the political and economic changes at the global and national levels in urban society that have led to the growth of export-based industries and the service sector, which then created more opportunities for Filipino women.

About one-third of businesses in the Philippines are operated by Filipino women. Many Filipino businesswomen in the urban sector can be found in the hospitality sector, marketing, publishing, real estate, transportation, financial consulting, trade and services, electronics and appliances, and much more.

Rural and tribal clan setting
In rural areas, the Filipino woman runs the household even if she should have a job.  The children approach her for money and help. She is the family's treasurer. She supports the children’s educational needs.  For non-family members who require support, the wife is the person to be approached. However, the wife is neither the person who makes the final decision or the person who hands out the money.

Juan Flavier, a physician, an authority on community development, and a former Philippine senator, described in his book, Doctor to the Barrios, that "whether some (Filipino) men are willing to admit it or not"... "rural women in the Philippines wield considerable authority," the housewife in particular.  This is especially if the housewife, who is often referred to as the Ilaw ng Tahanan (Light of the Home), is convinced of the benefits that will be gained from a certain practice such as the concept of family planning in the barrios.  Flavier also mentioned that "In the Philippine barrio, the one responsible for the home" and its management "is the wife... she holds the key to... household... development."

Marriage and relationships
Courtship and relationships in the Philippines are conservative in nature. The man will have to court the woman and prove his love for her before he can win her heart. Sometimes the courtship period would last for years. This however, is a very old fashioned idea. In the bigger more urbanized cities, this conservative courtship idea is not so emphasized as much. Parents prefer their daughter to be courted in their home, so they can have a chance to know the man. It is during the courtship period that the man would put his best foot forward to create a good impression on the woman and her family. Generally, the man is being measured on his being a gentleman, ability to respect the woman's family, and servitude (the extent of what he was willing to do to prove his love for the woman). Usually, the woman is courted by several men and will have to choose the best from among her suitors. Courtship and relationships remain the same for rural and urban areas despite the modern western influence.

The Philippines and Vatican City are the only countries in the world to prohibit divorce (the Philippines allows divorce for Muslims). The Philippines is one of the few non-Muslim majority countries to maintain a criminal law against adultery; and the law differentiates between female infidelity (Article 333 called Adultery) and male infidelity (Article 334 called Concubinage, which has a more narrow definition and is punished less severely). Furthermore, Article 247 called Death or physical injuries inflicted under exceptional circumstances, provides that the killing of a spouse and/or of the partner of the spouse caught in the act of extramarital sex by the other spouse, as well as the killing of a daughter caught by the parent in the act of premarital sex, are to be punished only by the symbolic punishment of destierro (banishment from a geographical area for a period of time). These laws are based on old Spanish laws that were repealed in Spain in 1963 (the "crime of passion" law) and in 1978 (the adultery law). The Philippine is also one of 20 countries that still has a marry-your-rapist law (that is, a law that exonerates a rapist from punishment if he marries the victim after the attack).

Culturally in the Philippines, divorce is viewed as negative and destructive, because of a tradition that emphasizes that the family is the core social unit, especially for the Filipino wife.  Divorce is not perceived as a solution to any matrimonial-related problem because it hinders the development or progress of the basic community unit. Therefore, husband and wife are obligated to fix any problems within the boundaries of the marriage.

Women in the pre-colonial Philippines enjoyed nearly equal status with men .  Prior to colonization, both men and women could get a divorce for the following reasons: failure to meet family obligations, childlessness, and infidelity.  Children, regardless of gender, and properties were equally divided in a divorce. Since a man needed to pay a dowry to the woman's family, she was required to give it back should she be found at fault.  If the man was at fault, he then lost the right to get back his dowry.

In the Philippines, society valued offspring regardless of gender. Female children were as valuable as male ones, mainly because they recognized that women are as important as men. Parents provide equal opportunities to their children. Filipino daughters can also go to school, inherit property, and even become village chiefs like Filipino sons.

Filipino women and work
Traditionally, rural and tribal women do all the household related chores. Heavy work that requires more strength is done by the husband. Now, the chore work is evenly distributed with the men doing just as much work as the women. The scope of their functions include cooking, cleaning, teaching the children, washing clothes, repairs, budgeting, and helping in the farm. The husband is the one who makes sure the farm would yield quality crops, so he does all the maintenance work. In some cases, where the husband needs help from other men, the wife would make sure that the men are fed, so she cooks food and bring it to the farm. The Filipino women, ensures that everyone is well fed, including any workers, relatives, or visitors.

In general, Filipino women find pride in their work. They do not find themselves alienated from their chores because they work with, around, and for their families. This family-oriented mindset gives them a sense of dignity and responsibility. The family and the children are the primary priority some Filipino women's life. In addition to doing housework, the contemporary role of a Filipino wife today is to provide financial support in the household by seeking employment in higher-earning occupations which then expands the Filipino female work outside the household.

In the early 1900s, the female workforce in the Philippines was also a highly debated topic during workers’ conferences.  In 1910, during the first Congress of Labor, the decision to enact a law that would regulate the employment of women and children was approved due to poor working conditions (“dark and ill-ventilated rooms, smoke-filled factories”, etc.) for women and children. Then, in March 1923, “An Act to Regulate the Employment of Women and Children in Agricultural and Non-Agricultural Establishments and Other Workplaces” was passed to oversee the welfare of women and children. In 1960, under the Department of Labor, the Bureau of Women and Minors was created and was responsible for the promotion, development, and the protection of the welfare of working women and minors. Since then, more acts were made to oversee the welfare of women workers, as seen in both the 1935 and 1973 constitutions.

Filipino women and Philippine politics

Compared to other countries, Filipino women have gained and enjoyed equal rights with men. They have become presidents, senators, congresswomen, mayors. They have served in government offices, and have held cabinet positions for presidents. Filipino women have proven that they are capable of carrying out responsibilities and tasks as well as their male counterparts. There are 48 women Representatives elected in the 15th Congress (2010 national election). They accounted for 21.6 percent of the total 222 Representatives as members of the Lower House. In 2010 Senatorial election, there were 14 women who ran out of 61 candidates (23.0%), of which two entered the top 12 winning senators (16.7%).

The number of women who engage in politics are smaller compare to their male counterparts. This was primarily because engagement in politics is considered "dirty."

A recent study revealed that there is a re-emergence of the empowerment of Filipino women through the political process, just as they were prior to the arrival of conquerors from Spain. Philippine women are rediscovering their strengths. Filipino women had been successful in implementing policies by becoming executive staff members, advisers to politicians, and as advocates within non-governmental organizations.

Modern-day Filipino women are making strides in electoral politics by initiating more female-oriented programs. They are performing well as leaders, although generally, Filipino women still often earn political seats by having fathers and husbands who are politically connected, a "dynasty system" that hinders other Filipino women from joining the electoral process. Other factors that prevent full-engagement of other well-qualified Filipino women from the Philippine political scene are the expense in politics and the importance of the family name.

Participation of Filipino women in Philippine politics was encouraged during the Beijing Declaration in 1995 at the United Nations' Fourth World Conference on Women. In February 2005, however, a United Nations review on the progress of Philippine women and their role in politics revealed that despite "an increase in the quality of female politicians, there was not enough increase in" the number of women participants in government activities. From 1992 to 2001, Filipino women had been elected as local chief executives, functioning as mayors, governors, and captains of villages. One influential factor contributing to the increasing number of female politicians, is the elevation of Corazon Aquino and Gloria Macapagal-Arroyo as Philippine women Presidents.

Babaylan in 21st century 
The Babaylan figure has resurfaced in Filipino diasporic communities as the indigenous Filipino concept is borrowed as a tool for decolonization practices and post-colonial discourse today. The Babaylan tradition and Babaylan-inspired practices are seen as an indigenous spiritual path among Filipinos in the Philippines and in the diaspora as a means to remembering relations to their homeland and healing.

Female genital mutilation
Female genital mutilation is  performed in the Philippines in the predominately Muslim Bangsamoro region in the south of the country. -

Filipino women in art

In his paintings of Filipino women, the Philippine National Artist Fernando Amorsolo rejected Western ideals of beauty in favor of Filipino ideals.  He said that the women he painted have "a rounded face, not of the oval type often presented to us in newspapers and magazine illustrations. The eyes should be exceptionally lively, not the dreamy, sleepy type that characterizes the Mongolian. The nose should be of the blunt form but firm and strongly marked. ... So the ideal Filipino beauty should not necessarily be white complexioned, nor of the dark brown color of the typical Malayan, but of the clear skin or fresh colored type which we often witness when we met a blushing girl."

Prominent women 
 Filipino women writers
 Corazon Aquino
 Imelda Marcos
 Gabriela Silang
 Melchora Aquino
 Lualhati Bautista
 Sara Duterte
 Leni Robredo

See also

 First Lady of the Philippines
 List of ancient Philippine consorts
 Women's rights in the Philippines
 National Commission on the Role of Filipino Women
 Men in the Philippines
 Courtship in the Philippines
 Women in the Philippine military
 Women in the Philippine National Police
 Women and government in the Philippines
 Violence against women in the Philippines

Works:
 Three Filipino Women
 Ermita: A Filipino Novel

Further reading on babaylan 

Babaylan: An Anthology of Filipina and Filipina American Literature published by Aunt Lute (2001)
 Babaylan conference in Germany organized by women advocating for the rights of Overseas Filipino Workers
 Filipino American journal - Pusod:Call of Nature (2001)
 Art exhibit at San Francisco State University - Sino Ka? Ano Ka? Babaylan featuring Babaylan-inspired art by Filipino American Artists
 Filipina American Women's Network conference in New York (2005)
 Babaylan conference held at St. Scholastica's College (2006) - celebration of the Feminist movement in the Philippines
 International Babaylan Conference at Sonoma State University (2010)
 Coming Full Circle: The Process of Decolonization Among Post 1965 Filipino Americans (2001)
 Between the Homeland and the Diaspora (2002)
 Pinay Power (2005)
 Sikolohiyang Pilipino/Filipino Indigenous Psychology

References

Further reading
 "A Celebration of Herstory: Filipino Women in Legislation and Politics, Perspective, About Culture and Arts", NCCA.gov.ph, October 27, 2003 (Taken from the Historical Framework for the Centennial Celebration of Women in Politics and Legislation, sponsored by Ugnayan ng Kababaihan sa Pulitika, National Centennial Commission – Women Sector and Committee on Women, House of Representatives, BayView Hotel, Manila, June 25, 1998), retrieved on: July 16, 2007 (archived from the original on 2008-02-23)
 Conlu, Prudencia V., "Role of Filipino women in fisheries community", Development of Fisheries in the Region: The Role of Filipino Women in Fishing Communities (presented by Professor Prudencia V. Conlu, Dean, College of Fisheries, University of the Philippines in the Visayas, Miag-as, Iloilo. Philippines), FAO Corporate Document Repository, FAO.org, 1994, retrieved on: July 16, 2007
 Creating a National Commission on the Role of Filipino Women, Presidential Decree No. 633, Malacañang Palace, Manila, LawPhil.net, January 7, 1975, retrieved on: July 16, 2007
 "Women 2000: Gender Equality, Development and Peace for the Twenty-first Century", Statement by Dr. Amelou Benitez Reyes, Chairperson, National Commission on the Role of Filipino Women, Head of Delegation, Twenty-third Special Session of the General Assembly, New York, UN.org, June 5 to 9, 2000, retrieved on: July 16, 2007
 
 
 
 Blake, Matthew. "The Role and Status of the Filipina, A Country Study: Philippines", The Library of Congress, Bansa.org, March 30, 2006, retrieved on: January 4, 2010
 Philippines: Specific Commitments Made at Beijing, Beyond Beijing: Taking Root and Gaining Ground Asia Pacific Development Centre – Gender and Development Programme (GAD-APDC), (This report is based on the proceedings of the Legislative Symposium on the government's implementation of the Beijing Platform for Action held on September 29, 1997, Philippines. The Committee on Women, House of Representatives and the Philippine NGO Beijing Score Board co-organized the symposium. The Committee on Women has the mandate to conduct congressional oversight on the implementation of laws and international instruments affecting the conditions of the Filipino women. The Philippine NGO Beijing Score Board is the main NGO network working with the government to monitor the implementation of the Platform for Action. During the Legislative Symposium, the report of the government was presented by Aurora Javate de Dios of the National Commission on the Role of Filipino Women who is also the Philippine representative to CEDAW), 1998, 260 pp., AWORC.org, retrieved on: July 16, 2007
 Caoile, Gloria T., "In Celebration of Filipino Women", Tambuli Magazine, IMDiversity.com, retrieved on: July 16, 2007
 Former President Fidel V. Ramos (FVR), Cites Role of Women in Nation's History and Development,The Manila Bulletin Online, MB.com, 2001, retrieved on: July 16, 2007 (archived from the original on 2008-02-25)
 The History of Filipino Women's Writings, an article from Firefly – Filipino Short Stories (Tulikärpänen – filippiiniläisiä novelleja), 2001 / 2007, retrieved on: April 12, 2008

External links

 National Commission on the Role of Filipino Women, retrieved on: April 9, 2008
 National Commission on the Role of Women, LawPhil.net, retrieved on: July 16, 2007
 Name of Organization: National Commission on the Role of Filipino Women, United Nations Economic and Social Commission for Asia and the Pacific, UNESCAP.org, retrieved on: July 16, 2007
 Philippines, Women's Studies, Bibliography, LIB.Berkeley.edu, retrieved on: July 16, 2007
 National Commission on the Role of Filipino Women (NCRFW), International Labour Organization, ILO.org, February 6, 2004, retrieved on: July 16, 2007

 
Philippines
Filipino women